The Mayflower Stakes was one of the premiere juvenile stakes in New England. Run at Suffolk Downs, the Mayflower was held from Suffolk's inauguration in 1935 to 1988, when Suffolk was purchased from the Ogden Corporation. Run from  furlongs to about  furlongs, the event was never graded.

Notable horses to race in the Mayflower Stakes were Alsab, Pavot, Quadrangle, Sword Dancer, Timely Writer, and Seabiscuit.

Three fillies have won an edition of this race.

Records
5 Furlongs:
 59.40 - Airflame (1936), setting a new track record
5.5 Furlongs:
 1:04.60 - Cocopet (1943), setting a new track record
6 Furlongs:
 1:10.20 - Handsome Boy (1965)
About 8 5/16 Furlongs:
 1:42.40 by Sword Dancer (1958)

Winning Margin:
 6 1/2 lengths - Pentelicus (1986)

Winners of the Mayflower

See also
Massachusetts Handicap

References

1935 establishments in Massachusetts
1988 disestablishments in Massachusetts
Horse races in the United States
Flat horse races for two-year-olds
Sports competitions in Boston
Suffolk Downs
Recurring sporting events established in 1935
Recurring sporting events disestablished in 1988